This is a list of notable glamour models.

A
Lene Alexandra
Alessandra Ambrosio
Pamela Anderson
Sophie Anderton
Sora Aoi
Danni Ashe
Gianne Albertoni
Gemma Atkinson
Coco Austin

B
Alley Baggett
Tanya Bardsley
Ana Beatriz Barros
Kelly Bell
Monica Bellucci
Bobbi Billard
Kelly Brook

C
Jordan Carver
Chyna
Jésica Cirio
Hannah Claydon
Jessica-Jane Clement
Lucy Collett
Sam Cooke

D
Cherry Dee
Jakki Degg
Amy Diamond
Stanija Dobrojević
Leilani Dowding
Katie Downes

E
Carmen Electra
Jennifer Ellison
Maria Eriksson

F
Mónica Farro
Isabeli Fontana
Samantha Fox

G
Bianca Gascoigne
Seren Gibson
Aria Giovanni
Louise Glover
Lauren Goodger
Betty Grable
Katie Green
Pamela Green
Amii Grove
Vida Guerra
Adabel Guerrero
Jo Guest

H
Janine Habeck
Shelley Hack
Chanelle Hayes
Keeley Hazell
Ruth Higham
Aisleyne Horgan-Wallace
Emily Horne
Chantelle Houghton
Sophie Howard
Sofia Hellqvist

I
Chanel Iman

K
Kataxenna Kova
Joanna Krupa
Anastasia Kvitko

L
Danielle Lloyd
Rebecca Loos
Jemma Lucy
Linda Lusardi

M
Holly Madison
Cindy Margolis
Bridget Marquardt
Jodie Marsh
Michelle Marsh
Melinda Messenger
Nell McAndrew
Karen McDougal
Linsey Dawn McKenzie
Nicola McLean
Natasha Mealey
Linni Meister
Marisa Miller
Heather Mills
Kara Monaco
Marilyn Monroe

N
Jessica Nigri
Margaret Nolan

O
Maryse Mizanin

P
Alyssa Nicole Pallett
June Palmer
Kayleigh Pearson
Holly Peers
Lindsey Pelas
Natalie Pike
Lucy Pinder
Lauren Pope
Gail Porter
Katie Price

R
Sophie Reade
India Reynolds
Lais Ribeiro
Tanya Robinson

S
Georgia Salpa
Sabrina Salerno
Sara Sampaio
Nikki Sanderson
Isabel Sarli
Danielle Sharp
Victoria Silvstedt
Chloe Sims
Carol Smillie
Anna Nicole Smith
Frida Sofía
Ewa Sonnet
Rhian Sugden

T
Dani Thompson
Abi Titmuss
Peta Todd

W
Madison Welch
Chelsea White
Maria Whittaker
Kendra Wilkinson
Iga Wyrwał

See also
List of pornographic performers by decade
List of Playboy models

Erotic photography
Glamour models
 List
Lists of models